Fabio Kwasi  is a Dutch heavyweight kickboxer currently signed to OSS Fighters. He is the 2020 OSS Fighters 05 and the 2016 WLF heavyweight tournaments winner, the Tafneft Cup season 2018 winner, and the 2016 K-1 World GP -95kg tournament runner-up.

He was ranked in the heavyweight top ten by Combat Press from November 2016 until September 2018, as well as from July 2021 until February 2022.

Kickboxing career
Fabio fought in the 2016 WFL four man heavyweight tournament. He defeated Brian Douwes by decision in the semifinals, and Sam Tevette by an extra round decision in the finals.

Kwasi took part in the 2016 K-1 Heavyweight tournament. He won decisions against Mladen Kujundžić in the quarterfinals, and Rade Opačić in the semifinals, but suffered a KO loss to Roman Kryklia in the finals.

After placing second in the K-1 tournament, Kwasi fought Ibrahim El Bouni during WFL's Almere event. El Bouni won by a third round KO.

Kwasi faced Arkadiy Lisin in the tenth season of Tafnet Cup. He won the fight by a first round TKO.

He fought in the WFL Heavyweight tournament, but lost to Murat Aygun in the quarterfinal bout.

Fabio won the Tatneft Arena Cup Heavyweight tournament, with a decision win against Igor Darmeshkin in the finals.

Kwasi participated in the 2020 OSS Fighters Heavyweight tournament. In the quarterfinals he defeated Buğra Erdoğan by decision. In the semifinals, he likewise defeated Clyde Brunswijk. He won the tournament final against Cristian Ristea by a third round TKO.

Kwasi was scheduled to face Cristian Ristea in a rematch at OSS Fighters 07 on November 19, 2021.

Mixed martial arts career
Kwasi is scheduled to make his mixed martial arts debut against Yassine Boughanem at Ares FC 7: Abdouraguimov vs. Amoussou on June 25, 2022.

Championships and awards
2020 OSS Fighters 05 Heavyweight Tournament Champion
2018 Tatneft Cup 2018 +80 kg Heavyweight World Champion
2016 K-1 World GP 2016 -95kg Championship Tournament Runner Up
2016 WFL Heavyweight Tournament Champion
2014 ISKA K-1 Rules European Cruiserweight (−88.5 kg/194 lb) Championship
 2013 BKBMO Benelux Champion -83 kg

Professional kickboxing record

|-
|-  bgcolor="#CCFFCC"
| 2020-02-07 || Win ||align=left| Cristian Ristea || OSS Fighters 05, Tournament Final||  Bucharest, Romania || TKO (referee stoppage) || 3 || 1:30
|-
! scope="row" style="background:white" colspan=9 | 
|-  bgcolor="#CCFFCC"
| 2020-02-07 || Win ||align=left| Clyde Brunswijk  || OSS Fighters 05, Tournament Semi Final ||  Bucharest, Romania || Decision || 3 ||3:00
|-  bgcolor="#CCFFCC"
| 2020-02-07 || Win ||align=left| Buğra Erdoğan || OSS Fighters 05, Tournament Quarter Final ||  Bucharest, Romania || Decision (unanimous) || 3 ||3:00
|-  bgcolor="#CCFFCC"
| 2018-12-07 || Win ||align=left| Igor Darmeshkin  ||Tatneft Cup 2018 Final ||  Kazan, Russia || Decision || 4 ||3:00  
|-
! scope="row" style="background:white" colspan=9 | 
|-
|-  bgcolor="#FFBBBB"  
| 2018-09-22 || Loss ||align=left| Murat Aygun || WFL: Final 8, Quarter Finals || Almere, Netherlands || Decision || 3 || 3:00
|-
|-  bgcolor="#FFBBBB"
| 2018-08-24 || Loss ||align=left| Kirill Kornilov ||Tatneft Cup 2018 1/2 Finals 1st Selection ||  Kazan, Russia || Decision (Unanimous) || 3 || 3:00 
|-
|-  bgcolor="#CCFFCC"
| 2018-05-31 || Win ||align=left| Maksim Sazontsev||Tatneft Cup 2018 1/4 Finals ||  Kazan, Russia || TKO (Referee Stoppage/Left Hook) || 2 || 
|-
|-  bgcolor="#CCFFCC"
| 2017-12-14 || Win ||align=left| Arkadiy Lisin ||Tatneft Cup Final||  Kazan, Russia || TKO (RTD) || 1 || 3:00
|-
|-  bgcolor="#CCFFCC"
| 2017-10-29 || Win ||align=left| Serkan Ozcaglayan || WFL: Manhoef vs. Bonjasky, Final 16  || Almere, Netherlands || TKO || 2 || 
|-
|-  bgcolor="#FFBBBB"
| 2017-05-27 || Loss ||align=left| Oleh Pryimachov || Emei Legend 19 || China || doctor stoppage (cut) || 2 || 0:40
|-
|-  bgcolor="#FFBBBB"
| 2017-04-23 || Loss ||align=left| Ibrahim El Bouni || WFL - Champion vs. Champion, Semi Finals || Almere, Netherlands || KO || 3 || 
|-
|-  bgcolor="#FFBBBB"
| 2016-10-27 || Loss ||align=left| Roman Kryklia || K-1 World GP 2016 -95kg Championship Tournament || Belgrade, Serbia || KO (Knee)||2 ||
|-
! scope="row" style="background:white" colspan=9 | 
|-
|-  bgcolor="#CCFFCC"
| 2016-10-27 || Win ||align=left| Rade Opačić || K-1 World GP 2016 -95kg Championship Tournament || Belgrade, Serbia || Decision (Unanimous)||3 ||3:00
|-
|-  bgcolor="#CCFFCC"
| 2016-10-27 || Win ||align=left| Mladen Kujundžić  || K-1 World GP 2016 -95kg Championship Tournament || Belgrade, Serbia || Decision (Unanimous)||3 ||3:00
|-
|-  bgcolor="#CCFFCC"
| 2016-10-15 || Win ||align=left| Lorenzo Javier Jorge || Campionato Del Mundo Profesional || Santa Cruz de Tenerife, Spain || TKO (Arm Injury) || 1 || 
|-
|-  bgcolor="#CCFFCC"
| 2016-04-03 || Win ||align=left| Sam Tevette || WFL: Where Heroes Meet Legends, Final || Hoofddorp, Netherlands || Extension round decision || 4 || 3:00
|-
! scope="row" style="background:white" colspan=9 | 
|-
|-  bgcolor="#CCFFCC"
| 2016-04-03 || Win ||align=left| Brian Douwes || WFL: Where Heroes Meet Legends, Semi Finals || Hoofddorp, Netherlands || Decision || 3 || 3:00
|- 
|-  bgcolor="#CCFFCC"
| 2016-03-26 || Win ||align=left| Martin Terpstra || North vs the Rest VII || Leek, Netherlands || Decision (unanimous) || 3 || 3:00
|- 
|-  bgcolor="#CCFFCC"
| 2015-11-21 || Win ||align=left| Patrick Veenstra || Enfusion Live #34 || Groningen, Netherlands || Decision || 3 || 3:00
|-
|-  bgcolor="#CCFFCC"
| 2015-09-25 || Win ||align=left| Mladen Kujundžić || WFL: Bosnia || Laktaši, Bosnia and Herzegovina || TKO (referee stoppage) || 2 ||
|-
|-  bgcolor="#FFBBBB"
| 2015-08-01 || Loss ||align=left| Bogdan Stoica || SUPERKOMBAT World Grand Prix IV 2015 || Mamaia, Romania || Decision (split) || 3 || 3:00
|-
|-  bgcolor="#CCFFCC"
| 2015-06-19 || Win ||align=left| Sebastian Ciobanu || SUPERKOMBAT World Grand Prix III 2015 || Constanța, Romania || Decision || 3 || 3:00
|-
|-  bgcolor="#FFBBBB"
| 2015-03-14 || Loss ||align=left| Robert Dorin	 || KOK World GP 2015 in Vilnius, Semi Finals || Vilnius, Lithuania || Decision (unanimous) || 3 || 3:00
|-
|-  bgcolor="#CCFFCC"
| 2014-10-04 || Win ||align=left| Enrico Rogge || Enfusion Live #21 || Merseburg, Germany || KO (knee to the head) || 1 || 1:14
|-
|-  bgcolor="#CCFFCC"
| 2014-09-27 || Win ||align=left| Mohammed Boudadour || United Fighting League || Marrakesh, Morocco || KO || 2 ||
|- 
|-  bgcolor="#CCFFCC"
| 2014-12-06 || Win ||align=left| Ben Vickers || Ronin || London, England || Decision || 3 ||  3:00
|- 
! scope="row" style="background:white" colspan=9 | 
|-
|-  bgcolor="#CCFFCC"
| 2013-09-21 || Win ||align=left| Iwan Pang || Warriors Today || Netherlands || KO || 3 ||
|- 
|-
| colspan=9 | Legend:

See also 
List of male kickboxers

References

Living people
Heavyweight kickboxers
Cruiserweight kickboxers
Dutch male kickboxers
People from Purmerend
1995 births
SUPERKOMBAT kickboxers
Sportspeople from North Holland